Mug Root Beer is an American brand of root beer that was originally produced in 1940 under the name Belfast Root Beer. It is now made by New Century Beverage Company of San Francisco, California, which was acquired by PepsiCo in 1986.

History 
Mug Root Beer was originally sold under the name Belfast Root Beer in 1940 by the Belfast Beverage Company in San Francisco, California. The company had been known for making sparkling water and ginger ale since 1877. Belfast Beverage Company was purchased around 1925 by New Century Beverage Company, which had successfully launched Crush Soda in 1918.

In 1936, New Century Beverage Company gained permission to franchise Pepsi-Cola products, and about four years later, it launched Belfast Root Beer. An advertisement for Belfast Root Beer appears as early as 1947. According to the San Francisco Examiner, the catchphrase, 'You haven’t tasted Root Beer like this in years!' filled 1950s newspaper advertisements." An advertisement for Belfast Old Fashioned Mug Root Beer appears as early as 1952. In the 1950s, the soda took on the title Belfast Old Fashioned Mug Root Beer before its name was eventually shortened to Mug Root Beer.

In the late 1960s, Sugar Free Mug (now Diet Mug Root Beer) was introduced. Mug Cream Soda and Diet Mug Cream Soda were later introduced, but they are not as widely available.  Mug was purchased by Pepsi in 1986, and replaced On-Tap Draft Style Root Beer as Pepsi's root beer brand.  Mug Root Beer is manufactured by independent bottlers under the authority of New Century Beverage Company.

Since Mug Root Beer's acquisition by PepsiCo in 1986, the company's mascot has been a bulldog named "Dog" holding a mug of Mug Root Beer. PepsiCo stopped producing its sodas in San Francisco in the early 1990s.

References

External links
 
 MUG   Trademark Update 72039315
 BELFAST - Brand - NEW CENTURY BEVERAGE COMPANY SAN FRANCISCO, CA - Serial Number: 72284549
 OLD FASHIONED MUG - Brand - BELFAST BEVERAGES, INC. SAN FRANCISCO , - Serial Number: 71602543

Root beer
PepsiCo soft drinks
PepsiCo brands
Food and drink in the San Francisco Bay Area